The 1980 Florida Gators football team represented the University of Florida during the 1980 NCAA Division I-A football season. The season was the Florida Gators football team's second season under new head coach Charles B. "Charley" Pell, and marked a remarkable one-year turnaround for the Gators from their 0–10–1 record in 1979.  The winless 1979 season was the worst season in Gators history, and it was Pell's first campaign as the new head coach of the Gators, after the Gators' previous head coach, Doug Dickey, was fired in the aftermath of a 4–7 season in 1978.  Pell's 1980 Florida Gators posted an 8–4 overall record and a Southeastern Conference (SEC) record of 4–2, tying for fourth place in the ten-team SEC.  The Gators capped their season with a 35–20 bowl victory over the Maryland Terrapins in the Tangerine Bowl, marking the first time in the history of major college football that a winless team received a bowl bid the following season. Linebacker David Little set the career record for tackles by a Gator and was consensus All-American. Receiver Cris Collinsworth was first-team All-American. The season features the famous "Run Lindsay Run" in the close loss to national champion Georgia.

Schedule

Primary source: 2015 Florida Gators Football Media Guide.

Personnel

Season summary

vs. Georgia

at Florida State

References

Florida
Florida Gators football seasons
Citrus Bowl champion seasons
Florida Gators football